George Duffield Jr. D.D. (September 12, 1818 – July 6, 1888) was an American Presbyterian minister and hymnodist.

He was born on September 12, 1818, the fifth such George Duffield. His father, George Duffield IV (1794–1868), was also a Presbyterian minister. His grandfather was George A. Duffield III (1767–1827). His great-grandfather, George Duffield II, was chaplain to the Continental Congress. His great-grandfather George D. Dunfield was a native of Belfast.

He graduated from Yale College in 1837 and the Union Theological Seminary in New York. He was a pastor from 1840 to 1869 at numerous cities including Brooklyn, New York; Bloomfield, New Jersey; Philadelphia, Pennsylvania; Adrian, Michigan; Galesburg, Illinois; Saginaw City, Michigan; Ann Arbor, Michigan, and Lansing, Michigan. He married and had a son, minister Samuel Willoughby Duffield. He died on July 6, 1888, and was buried at Elmwood Cemetery in Detroit.

Legacy
Duffield was known as a zealous advocate of abolition and Union causes during the U.S. Civil War. Upon the tragic death of another abolitionist and friend, he shared in a sermon, "I caught its inspiration from the dying words of that noble young clergyman, Rev. Dudley Atkins Tyng, rector of the Epiphany Church, Philadelphia, who died about 1854. His last words were, ‘Tell them to stand up for Jesus: now let us sing a hymn.’ As he had been much persecuted in those pro-slavery days for his persistent course in pleading the cause of the oppressed, it was thought that these words had a peculiar significance in his mind; as if he had said, ‘Stand up for Jesus in the person of the downtrodden slave.’ (Luke 4:18)"

Hymns
His hymns include:
 "Blessed Saviour, Thee I love"
 "Parted for some anxious days"
 "Praise to our heavenly Father, God"
 "Slowly in sadness and in tears"
 "Stand up, stand up for Jesus"

References

Further reading

External links 
 

American Protestant hymnwriters
1812 births
1888 deaths
Yale College alumni
American Presbyterian ministers
19th-century Presbyterian ministers
Union Theological Seminary (New York City) alumni
19th-century American writers
Regents of the University of Michigan
19th-century American musicians
Burials at Elmwood Cemetery (Detroit)
19th-century American clergy